Ailanthus (derived from ailanto, an Ambonese word probably meaning "tree of the gods" or "tree of heaven") is a genus of trees belonging to the family Simaroubaceae, in the order Sapindales (formerly Rutales or Geraniales). The genus is native from east Asia south to northern Australasia.

Selected species

The number of living species is disputed, with some authorities accepting up to ten species, while others accept six or fewer. Species include:
Ailanthus altissima  (tree of heaven, syn. A. vilmoriniana ) – northern and central mainland China, Taiwan. Invasive in North America, Europe, Britain, and Australia. Serves as central metaphor in A Tree Grows in Brooklyn.
Ailanthus excelsa  – India and Sri Lanka
Ailanthus fordii  – China
Ailanthus integrifolia  – New Guinea and Queensland, Australia
Ailanthus triphysa  (white siris syn. A. malabarica) – India, South-east Asia and Australia
Ailanthus vietnamensis  – Vietnam

There is a good fossil record of Ailanthus with many species names based on their geographic occurrence, but almost all of these have very similar morphology and have been grouped as a single species among the three species recognized:
Ailanthus tardensis  – from a single locality in Hungary
Ailanthus confucii  – Tertiary period, Europe, Asia, and North America
Ailanthus gigas  – from a single locality in Slovenia
Ailanthus pythii  – known from the Miocene of Iceland, Styria in Austria and the Gavdos island in Greece
Ailanthus kurzii  – endemic to the Andaman Islands, India

Ailanthus silk moth
A silk spinning moth, the ailanthus silkmoth (Samia cynthia), lives on Ailanthus leaves, and yields a silk more durable and cheaper than mulberry silk, but inferior to it in fineness and gloss. This moth has been introduced to the eastern United States and is common near many towns; it is about 12 cm across, with angulated wings, and in color olive brown, with white markings. Other Lepidoptera whose larvae feed on Ailanthus include Endoclita malabaricus.

See also
 Spotted lanternfly

References 

Germplasm Resources Information Network: Ailanthus
Plant Conservation Alliance's Alien Plant Working Group: Least Wanted

 
Sapindales genera